The Church of The Good Shepherd, Lake is a parish church in the Church of England located in Lake, Isle of Wight.

History

The church was built in 1892 by the architect Temple Lushington Moore. Its distinctive feature is the twin aisled nave with the single aisle chancel. The stained glass windows were designed by Francis Skeat in the mid 20th-century.

The church is located on Sandown Road.

The church has a small three manual pipe organ by J. W. Walker & Sons Ltd dating from 1901.

See also
List of new churches by Temple Moore

References

Church of England church buildings on the Isle of Wight
Grade II listed churches on the Isle of Wight
Temple Moore buildings
Churches completed in 1892
Anglo-Catholic church buildings on the Isle of Wight